The Jones & Collins Astoria Hot Eight were an American jazz band.

The Jones & Collins Astoria Hot Eight were led by cornetist Lee Collins and tenor saxophonist David Jones. They took their name from the "Astoria Gardens" the dance hall room of the Astoria Hotel on Rampart Street in New Orleans where they were the house band in 1928 and 1929. The group included a number of noted New Orleans jazz musicians in its relatively short life.

The ensemble recorded only once, doing a session at the Italian Hall in New Orleans on November 15, 1929 [some sources list December 15, 1929]. A total of four sides were released from these sessions: "Astoria Strut" b/w "Duet Stomp", issued on Victor Records, and "Damp Weather" b/w "Tip Easy Blues", issued on Bluebird Records.  Alternative takes of Damp Weather and Tip Easy Blues survived to appear on reissues decades later.

Members
Lee Collins - cornet
David Jones - tenor saxophone
Nat Story - trombone (does not play on the recording)
Big Eye Louis Nelson - clarinet (does not play on the recording)
Sidney Arodin - clarinet; substituting for Nelson on the recording session.
Theodore Purnell - alto saxophone
Joseph Robichaux - piano
Emanuel Sayles - banjo
Al Morgan - double bass
Joe Strode (Joe Stouger) - drums

References

Mike Hazeldine, "Jones and Collins Astoria Hot Eight". Grove Jazz online.

American jazz ensembles from New Orleans
Musical groups from New Orleans